Elections to Liverpool Town Council were held on Monday 1 November 1875. One third of the council seats were up for election, the term of office of each councillor being three years.
Eleven of the sixteen wards were uncontested.

After the election, the composition of the council was:

Election result

Because of the large number of uncontested seats, these statistics should be taken in that context.

Ward results

* - Retiring Councillor seeking re-election

Abercromby

Castle Street

Everton

Exchange

Great George

Lime Street

North Toxteth

Pitt Street

Rodney Street

St. Anne Street

St. Paul's

St. Peter's

Scotland

South Toxteth

Vauxhall

West Derby

By-elections

No. 16, North Toxteth, 6 November 1875

Caused by the death of Alderman Charles Turner MP which was reported to the Council on 25 October 1875.
This position was filled by the election of Councillor Joseph Harrison (Conservative, North Toxteth, elected 1 November 1873) as an alderman.

Aldermanic Election, 22 May 1876

The death of the Mayor, Alderman Peter Thompson was reported to the Council 
on 22 May 1876.

Former Councillor Andrew Boyd (Conservative, Rodney Street, last elected 24th 
September 1875 to 1 November 1875) was elected as an alderman by the Council 
(Councillors and Aldermen) on 22 May 1876.

No. 14, West Derby, 3 August 1876

Caused by the resignation of Alderman John Stopford Taylor.

Councillor Edward Samuelson (Conservative, West Derby, elected 1 November 1874) 
was elected as an alderman by the Council (Councillors and Aldermen) on 19 July 1876.

No. 3, Vauxhall, 6 September 1876

Caused by the death of Councillor James Whitty which was reported to the Council on 4 October 1876.

See also

 Liverpool City Council
 Liverpool Town Council elections 1835 - 1879
 Liverpool City Council elections 1880–present
 Mayors and Lord Mayors of Liverpool 1207 to present
 History of local government in England

References

1875
1875 English local elections
November 1875 events
1870s in Liverpool